Teen Mom 2 is an American reality television series that premiered January 11, 2011 on MTV. It originally followed  the lives of Jenelle Evans, Chelsea DeBoer, Kailyn Lowry, and Leah Messer from  the second season of 16 and Pregnant as they navigate their first years of motherhood. The series also focuses on the themes of their changing relationships between family, friends, and boys, while highlighting the struggles of young mothers raising children.

In June 2017, it was announced that former Teen Mom 3 star Briana DeJesus would join the cast of Teen Mom 2. In May 2019, following Evans' firing from the show, it was announced that Teen Mom: Young and Pregnant star Jade Cline would join the cast. In October 2020, Chelsea Houska announced her departure from the series after 10 seasons. In December 2020, it was reported that Ashley Jones from Teen Mom: Young and Pregnant would be joining the show to replace Houska.

After its last episode on May 24, 2022, the series was merged into Teen Mom OG, with cast members of each series transitioning to a combined series titled Teen Mom: The Next Chapter, which premiered on September 6, 2022.

Cast

Jenelle Evans
Jenelle Evans (from Oak Island, North Carolina) is the mother of Jace, but with her son's father out of the picture, Jenelle relied heavily on her mother Barbara, who currently has permanent custody of Jace, while Jenelle has limited visitation.

On December 4, 2012, Jenelle married Courtland Rogers. The couple got engaged in November 2012 and were expecting her second child. It was announced on January 25, 2013 that she and Courtland had split and that she had an abortion.

In June 2013, Jenelle started dating Nathan Griffith. Within months of dating they moved in together and she became pregnant with their first child. On December 14, 2013, Evans was arrested for disturbing the peace after an argument with Griffith. On June 29, 2014 she gave birth to her second child, son Kaiser Orion Griffith. In January 2015 Jenelle and Nathan got engaged, but they broke off the engagement that August. After their breakup, the former couple became engaged in a custody battle over Kaiser. In January 2017, Jenelle and Nathan reached a joint custody agreement in court.

In September 2015, Jenelle started dating David Eason, an alleged pipewelder she met on Tinder and they quickly moved in together. David had previously met Jenelle's ex-husband, Courtland Rogers, when they were cellmates in prison. David has two children from previous relationships: daughter Maryssa Rose and son Kaden David. Jenelle gave birth to their first child together, daughter Ensley Jolie Eason, on January 24, 2017. The couple got married on September 23, 2017. On October 13, 2018, police were called to Evans' house for a physical assault with Eason. According to Evans, Eason slammed her to the ground and sprained her collarbone. Evans went to the hospital following the incident. Evans claimed that Eason had been drinking, which contributed to the assault. Evans decided to not press charges and no police report was filed. In April 2019, it was reported that Eason beat and shot Evans's dog, Nugget. As a result of the incident, MTV decided to forgo filming any future seasons with Jenelle.

Chelsea DeBoer
Chelsea DeBoer (née Houska) (from Sioux Falls, South Dakota) is the mother of Aubree Skye Lind. Since giving birth to her first daughter, Chelsea's life has been consumed with taking care of herself and trying to make her tumultuous relationship with Aubree's father, Adam Lind, succeed. She obtained her GED after years of working towards it and has begun attending beauty school. During the sixth season, Chelsea was in a custody battle with Adam over Aubree. He wanted joint custody, while Chelsea wanted to keep the current custody arrangement. In March 2015, the court ruled in Chelsea's favor.

In late 2014, Chelsea met Cole DeBoer, introduced Cole in the season six premiere of Teen Mom 2 and eventually, they moved in together. The couple became engaged on November 18, 2015, and married on October 1, 2016. On January 25, 2017, Chelsea and Cole welcomed their first child, son Watson Cole DeBoer. On August 29, 2018 (her 27th birthday), Chelsea welcomed her third child, a girl named Layne Ettie DeBoer. On January 25, 2021, Chelsea gave birth to daughter Walker June.

In October 2020, Houska announced her departure from the series following the conclusion of the tenth season.

Kailyn Lowry
Kailyn Lowry (previously Marroquin) (from Whitehall Township, Pennsylvania) gave birth to her first child Isaac in 2010, but her relationship with Isaac's father, Jo Rivera, crumbled under the stress of balancing their lives and raising their child, and Kailyn moved out amidst their constant fighting. A romance with coworker Jordan got more serious as she turned to him for emotional support during the custody battle with Jo.

During season 4, Lowry developed a relationship with Javi Marroquin. The two got engaged after a few months of dating, and married on September 4, 2013. Kailyn gave birth to their first child, son Lincoln Marshall Marroquin, on November 16, 2013. The couple filed for divorce in December 2015.

On August 5, 2017, Lowry gave birth to her third son, Lux Russell Lowry. The father is a friend Chris Lopez. Lowry's fourth child, Creed Romello Lopez, was born on July 30, 2020.

Leah Messer
Leah Messer (previously Simms and Calvert) (from Elkview, West Virginia) is a former cheerleader and the teen mother of twins Aliannah Hope "Ali" and Aleeah Grace "Gracie". From a small town outside of Charleston, West Virginia. Leah and ex-husband Corey Simms eventually learn that Ali suffers from Titin muscular dystrophy.

In August 2011, Leah started dating Jeremy Calvert. They married on April 4, 2012, after eight months of dating, and had their first child, daughter Adalynn Faith "Addie" Calvert, on February 4, 2013. In April 2015, Jeremy filed for divorce from Leah after three years of marriage. On June 8, 2015, the couple finalized their divorce. Leah was given custody of Addie, while Jeremy received visitation rights.

Leah dated Jason Jordan, a medical salesman she met through his cousin, who is a friend of hers starting in April 2018. They split up in 2019.

Briana DeJesus
Briana DeJesus (from Orlando, Florida) got pregnant by her ex-boyfriend, DeVoin Austin II. Her first daughter Nova Star DeJesus was born on September 10, 2011. Previously one-fourth of the cast for Teen Mom 3 and a participant on Family Therapy with Dr. Jenn, DeJesus' casting for Teen Mom 2 was announced on June 5, 2017. Briana gave birth to her second daughter, Stella Star, on July 2, 2017. The father is Luis Hernández.

Jade Cline
Jade Cline (from Indianapolis, Indiana) is the mother of Kloie Kenna Austin. The father is her fiancé Sean Austin. Previously part of the Teen Mom: Young and Pregnant cast, Cline's casting was confirmed in May 2019, replacing Jenelle Eason.

Ashley Jones
Ashley Jones (from Vallejo, California) is the mother of Holly Isabella Lockett who was born on September 15, 2017. The father is her husband, Bariki Smith. Previously part of the Teen Mom: Young and Pregnant cast, Jones' casting was announced in December 2020, replacing Chelsea DeBoer.

Timeline of cast members

Episodes

References

External links 

2010s American reality television series
2011 American television series debuts
2022 American television series endings
American television spin-offs
English-language television shows
Teenage pregnancy in television
MTV reality television series
Reality television spin-offs
Television series about teenagers